The Puerto Rico national under-17 basketball team, is controlled by the Puerto Rican Basketball Federation. It represents Puerto Rico in international under-17 and under-16 (under age 17 and under age 16) basketball competitions.

Centrobasket U17 championship
 2005: Gold Medal 
 2007: Gold Medal 
 2009: Gold Medal 
 2011: Gold Medal 
 2013: Silver Medal 
 2015: Gold Medal 
 2017: Gold Medal

FIBA Americas Under-16 Championship
 2009: 6th
 2011: 4th
 2013: 4th
 2015: 6th
 2017: Bronze Medal 
 2019: 6th
 2021: 7th

FIBA Under-17 Basketball World Cup
 2014: 5th
 2018: Bronze Medal

See also
 Puerto Rican Basketball Federation
 Puerto Rico men's national basketball team

References

 FIBA U16 Americas Championship All-time Medalists
 FIBA U16 Americas Championshop - History
 

Men's national under-17 basketball teams
FBPR